Methwold ("Middle forest") is a village and civil parish in the English county of Norfolk, on the edge of the Norfolk Fens and Breckland.
With an area of  it is the second largest parish in Norfolk. It had a population of 1,476 in 591 households at the 2001 census, increasing to 1,502 at the 2011 Census. For the purposes of local government, it falls within the district of King's Lynn and West Norfolk.

Its economy is based on agriculture with a little light industry.

The Duchy of Lancaster Methwold CofE Primary School is located in the parish. The secondary and sixth form departments of Iceni Academy are also located in Methwold, previously being known as Methwold High School.

Methwold parish is the second largest parish in Norfolk in terms of land. Farming in Methwold and the surrounding areas accounts for a vast majority of jobs in the fens. Even if people don't farm, much of the work is connected with the land.

Methwold became famous for its abundance and excellence of its rabbits which were sold by poulterers as "Muel Rabbits". According to John Marius Wilson, Methwold was formerly a market town.  A meal of Muel Rabbits was reputed to have pleased the king to such an extent that he granted the village a charter for the market to be held.

The village was struck by an F1/T2 tornado on 23 November 1981, as part of the record-breaking nationwide tornado outbreak on that day.

Notable residents
 William Thorold M.Inst.C.E., millwright, architect and civil engineer was born in Methwold on 9 October 1798.
 Richard Maurice Bucke, M.D., psychiatrist, author and philosopher was born in Methwold 18 March 1837.

References

External links
 Methwold Parish Website Methwold.net
 Methwold History Group

Villages in Norfolk
King's Lynn and West Norfolk
Civil parishes in Norfolk